Karelianite is an rare mineral, a natural form of vanadium(III) oxide, V2O3. In terms of chemistry it is vanadium-analogue of hematite, corundum, eskolaite, tistarite, bixbyite, avicennite, and yttriaite-(Y). The name comes from Karelia, a region on the Finnish-Russian border.  It may be associated with magnesium-rich rocks.

References

Oxide minerals
Vanadium minerals
Hematite group
Trigonal minerals